Chryseobacterium hungaricum  is a bacterium from the genus of Chryseobacterium which has been isolated from soil which was contaminated with hydrocarbon in Tököl in Hungary.

References

Further reading

External links
Type strain of Chryseobacterium hungaricum at BacDive -  the Bacterial Diversity Metadatabase

hungaricum
Bacteria described in 2008